Clanculus waltonae is a species of sea snail, a marine gastropod mollusk in the family Trochidae, the top snails.

Description
The shell may attain a height of 10 mm.

Distribution
This marine species occurs off False Bay to  East London, South Africa

References

External links
 To Biodiversity Heritage Library (1 publication)
 To World Register of Marine Species
 
  .Barnard K.H., Contributions to the knowledge of South African marine Mollusca. Part IV. Gastropoda : Prosobranchiata; Annals of the South African Museum. Annale van die Suid-Afrikaanse Museum v.47 (1963-1974)

Endemic fauna of South Africa
waltonae
Gastropods described in 1892